St Bartholomew's Church is a small Romanesque Anglican church located in Castltown-Kinneigh, County Cork, Ireland. It was completed in 1856, and is dedicated to Bartholomew the Apostle. It is part of the Kinneigh Union of Parishes in the Diocese of Cork, Cloyne, and Ross. Kinneigh Round Tower is located on the church grounds, and is the only round tower in Ireland with a hexagonal base.

History 
Following the destruction of a 7th-century monastic site by Vikings, a new monastery was built at the present site of the church, and the round tower was erected. The current church building was completed in 1856, replacing an earlier church from 1794.

A memorial to Richard O'Sullivan Burke is located on the exterior walls of the church grounds.

Architecture 
St Batholomew's is built in the Romanesque style, and features a six-bay nave, a single-bay chancel, and a vestry.

Round tower 

Kinneigh Round Tower is the only surviving feature of a monastery founded by St Mocholmóg in the 7th century, though the tower itself was likely not built until the 11th century. During the mid-19th century it was in use as a bell tower.

References

Notes

Sources 

 

Architecture in Ireland
Churches in the Diocese of Cork, Cloyne and Ross
19th-century Church of Ireland church buildings